Pontiothauma is a genus of sea snails, marine gastropod mollusks in the family Raphitomidae.

Description
The fusiform shell is not umbilicate, anteriorly rostrate and obliquely folded. The shell is spirally furrowed by lirae. The aperture ends in a short siphonal canal. The simple columella is not folded. The outer lip is thin, posteriorly wide but not deeply sinuate. The shell lacks an operculum.

The enormously expanded rostrum, and the absence of eyes, radula, and operculum, at once separate this genus from any which it approaches in shell-character.

Species
Species within the genus Pontiothauma include:
 Pontiothauma abyssicola Smith E. A., 1895
 Pontiothauma minus Smith E. A., 1906
 Pontiothauma mirabile Smith E. A., 1895
 Pontiothauma pacei Smith E. A., 1906
Species brought into synonymy
 Pontiothauma ergata Hedley, 1916: synonym of Belaturricula ergata (Hedley, 1916)
 Pontiothauma fusiforme Habe, 1962: synonym of Spergo fusiformis (Habe, 1962) (original combination)
 Pontiothauma hedleyi Dell, 1990: synonym of Aforia hedleyi  (Dell, 1990)
 Pontiothauma viridis (Okutani, 1966): synonym of Belomitra viridis (Okutani, 1966)

References

 Pace, S. "On the Anatomy of the Prosobranch Genus Pontiothauma, EA Smith." Zoological Journal of the Linnean Society 28.186 (1903): 455-462.
 Smith, Edgar A. "I.—Natural history notes from HM Indian marine survey steamer ‘Investigator,’commander CF Oldham, RN—Series II., No. 19. Report upon the Mollusca dredged in the bay of Bengal and the Arabian sea during the season 1893–94." Journal of Natural History 16.91 (1895): 1-19.
 Smith, Edgar A. "XXV.—Natural history notes form RIMS ‘Investigator.’—Series III., No. 10. On Mollusca from the Bay of Bengal and the Arabian Sea." Journal of Natural History 18.105 (1906): 157-175.
 Powell, A. W. B. "Mollusca of Antarctic and Subantarctic seas." Biogeography and ecology in Antarctica. Springer, Dordrecht, 1965. 333-380.

External links 
 
 Worldwide Mollusc Species Data Base: Raphitomidae
  Bouchet, P.; Kantor, Y. I.; Sysoev, A.; Puillandre, N. (2011). A new operational classification of the Conoidea (Gastropoda). Journal of Molluscan Studies. 77(3): 273-308.
 Kantor, Yuri I., and John D. Taylor. "Foregut anatomy and relationships of raphitomine gastropods (Gastropoda: Conoidea: Raphitominae)." Bollettino Malacologico 38 (2003): 83-110.

 
Raphitomidae
Gastropod genera